Sylvan Esso is the debut studio album by American electropop group Sylvan Esso, released  via Partisan Records. The band consists of singer Amelia Meath (of Mountain Man) and producer Nick Sanborn (of Megafaun).

The album reached number 39 on the Billboard 200 and number 7 on the Independent Albums chart, and as of November 2014 has sold 39,000 copies.

Critical reception

The album has received positive reviews from critics, with a score of 77 out of 100 on Metacritic, based on 18 reviews. James Christopher Monger of AllMusic described the album as "club- and café-ready, artsy and cool". Lior Phillips of Consequence of Sound gave the album a positive review and stated that the combination of Meath and Sanborn for the album is "a true achievement for a duo who are just starting to sow their musical seeds".

Track listing

A.

Charts

Weekly charts

Year-end charts

References

External links
 

2014 debut albums
Sylvan Esso albums
Partisan Records albums